Top XX Football Club is a Guyanese football club based in Linden, competing in the Guyana National Football League, the top tier of Guyanese football.

References

Football clubs in Guyana